The Bar railway station is a railway station located in Bar, Montenegro.

History
The decision to build the railway connection between Belgrade and Bar was made in 1952 as a national project of the Socialist Federal Republic of Yugoslavia. However, the construction was passed to the constituent Republics, SR Serbia and SR Montenegro, to build on their own sections. The Podgorica – Bar section was completed in 1959, with the construction works concluded on 27 November 1975 by joining the railway tracks south of Kolašin. The railway was opened on 28 May 1976 by President of Yugoslavia Josip Broz Tito and First Lady Jovanka Broz. Electrification was completed at the end of 1977.

Services
It is one of 52 scheduled stops on the Belgrade–Bar railway and the main southern terminal (freight trains continue south to the port). The station is served by both Montenegro Railways and Serbian Railways for regular Serbia-Montenegro routes, however during the summer season, it also serves Macedonian Railways (Bar-Skopje line). and Russian Railways (Bar-Moscow line).

See also 
 Railway stations in Montenegro

References 

Railway stations in Montenegro
Buildings and structures in Bar, Montenegro